The 1967–68 St. Francis Terriers men's basketball team represented St. Francis College during the 1967–68 NCAA men's basketball season. The team was coached by Daniel Lynch, who was in his twentieth year at the helm of the St. Francis Terriers. The Terriers played their homes games at the 69th Regiment Armory and were members of the Metropolitan Collegiate Conference.

The Terriers finished the season at 7–16 overall and 0–8 in conference play. After the season, the Terriers left the Metropolitan Collegiate Conference and would play as Independents from 1968 until 1981, before joining the ECAC Metro Conference.

Roster

    

source

Schedule and results

|-
!colspan=12 style="background:#0038A8; border: 2px solid #CE1126;;color:#FFFFFF;"| Regular Season

References

St. Francis Brooklyn Terriers men's basketball seasons
St. Francis
Saint Francis
Saint Francis